Joshua Ben Karha (Yehoshua ben Karcha (or ben Korcha), was a Jewish Tanna sage of the fourth generation.

Biography
He was a colleague of Rabbi Meir and Shimon ben Gamliel II, and a disciple of Rabbi Akiva.

Some believe that he was the son of Rabbi Akiva, who is referred to in the Talmud as the "," the 'bald-headed one'. However, others disagree. He never mentions Akiva in his teachings, and would have done so had Akiva been his father.

Joshua was bald; and once in a dispute with a heretic who taunted him on this score, he refuted his opponent with remarkable readiness of wit.

His affection for his people is shown by the indignation with which he rebuked Eleazar b. Simeon (who had delivered the Jewish criminals over to the Romans): "You vinegar son of wine [= "degenerate scion of a noble father"], how long will you give the people of our God unto death?".

He lived to a great age; and when he blessed Judah haNasi he added the wish that Judah might live half as long as himself.

Teachings

The Mishnah cites few of Ben Karha's halakhic commentaries in his name, and the few ones that are recorded, are either in context with him or in conjunction with another Tannaitic sage. Thus, in another reference, the Talmud cites Karha's practice as performed on the authority of Eleazar ben Azariah, and in an additional reference, on the authority of R. Yochanan ben Nuri. Similarly, he gave his halakhic ruling along with R. Jose ben Halafta, in the matter of the construction of Jericho.

In comparison with the few halachic commentaries, many aggadah commentaries are recorded in his name.

References

Mishnah rabbis